Peter Gregg may refer to:

 Peter Gregg (racing driver) (1940–1980), auto racing driver
 Peter Gregg (musician) (born 1951), guitarist who played for the predecessor to Devo